The Symphony of Fire is an annual multi-day fireworks exhibition and friendly international competition held around the world. The fireworks are choreographed to music. They continue  to be presented at Victoria & Alfred waterfront in Cape Town.

It was presented at English Bay in Vancouver, British Columbia, and at the Lake Ontario waterfront of the Ontario Place theme park in Toronto, Ontario, Canada until 2000, when these presentations were forced to seek new sponsors and, thus, the exhibition changed names.

History
The event had been previously sponsored by British American Tobacco (with the branding Benson & Hedges Symphony of Fire), but once tobacco advertising restrictions were legislated by the Canadian federal government in 2000, there were fears that the event would fail to receive sufficient funding to continue operations.

The Vancouver event, with various sponsors, has been re-branded as the Celebration of Light.

British American Tobacco informed Ontario Place Corporation, the hosts of the Toronto exhibition, that they could continue holding the annual event, but under a different name, as the Symphony of Fire trademark vested with Benson and Hedges. The Toronto event has since been renamed the Canada Dry Festival of Fire.

In South Africa, the event is still marketed under the name Symphony of Fire and is sponsored by a local radio station.

The Cape Town events took place in 2000 and March 2006. Spain, Canada and South Africa took part in the 2006 event with South Africa winning on the 8 April.

First events 
Vancouver: 4 July to 5 August 1990. Gold Jupiter Winner A.Caballer(Spain) with design by Alberto Navarro. First time using Pyrodigital Firing System.
Toronto: 1987 - took place at Ontario Place. 1990 Gold Jupiter Winner A.Caballer(Spain) with design by Alberto Navarro.

References 
tobacco.org: Tobacco firm ends funding of Symphony of Fire
Symphony of Fire in South Africa
Ontario Place: Canada Dry Festival of Fire
KFM Symphony of Fire in South Africa

Fireworks in Canada
Festivals in Toronto
Festivals in Vancouver